Center School, a one-room schoolhouse in the Southwest Allen County School District, Fort Wayne, Indiana, was built in 1893 as the first public school in the district. It was retired from the school system in 1946 but reopened as a site for history classes in 1969. The building was physically relocated 3/10th of a mile away in 1993, and restored to its original 19th-century state in 1995, this restoration winning an "Arch Award" from the Arch Foundation.

The brick building has a slate roof and copper ridge caps, supporting a copper-capped bell tower which has become the logo of the school district. The interior oak woodwork, flooring, and arches have all been restored to their original state.

The building is open to schools and colleges and to adult groups.

External links
 Center School
 Southwest Allen County Schools

Educational institutions established in 1893
Buildings and structures in Fort Wayne, Indiana
Education in Fort Wayne, Indiana
One-room schoolhouses in Indiana
Schoolhouses in the United States
1893 establishments in Indiana